Paul Anthony Furlong (born 1 October 1968) is an English football coach and former professional player who played as a striker. He was appointed joint manager of Queens Park Rangers' U23 team in 2021.

Furlong played in the top division of English football for Coventry City and Chelsea and in the lower divisions for Watford, Birmingham City, Queens Park Rangers, Sheffield United, Luton Town, Southend United and Barnet. He has also played non-League football for Enfield, Kettering Town and St Albans City, where he was player-coach. At representative level, he has six caps for the England semi-professional team.

Playing career

Coventry City
He began his career at non-League level with Conference side Enfield in 1986, remaining there until July 1991 when he signed for Football League First Division side Coventry City. He was brought to Highfield Road by the club's player-manager and former England defender Terry Butcher, and when Butcher was sacked in January he remained in favour under new manager Don Howe. Furlong only managed four goals from 37 league games all season, however, and after the season ended he was transferred to Watford.

Watford
Furlong was much more successful at Watford in Division One (the new name for the original Second Division after the creation of the Premier League), and was voted Watford Player of the Season in 1993. Although he failed to inspire Watford to a promotion challenge, he established himself as one of the finest strikers in the division at this time, alongside the likes of Steve Bull and Stan Collymore.

Chelsea
At the end of the 1993–94 season, he became Chelsea's record signing in a £2.3million deal, and that season he helped them reach the UEFA Cup Winners' Cup semi-finals (losing to Real Zaragoza by a single goal) as well as finish 11th in the Premier League. However, the arrival of Ruud Gullit and Mark Hughes during the 1995 close season reduced his first team opportunities, and following the arrival of Gianluca Vialli a year later he opted to move on. During his time at Chelsea he scored 18 goals in 85 matches in all competitions.

Birmingham City
He became Birmingham City's record signing in a £1.5 million deal. Although it meant dropping down a division, Furlong knew he would have more chances of first team action in the West Midlands, and was part of an ambitious side managed by Trevor Francis and containing fellow big names including Steve Bruce, Mike Newell and Gary Ablett. He remained at St Andrew's for six years, scoring 50 goals in 130 Division One games, and having loan spells at Queen's Park Rangers (twice) and Sheffield United.

Queens Park Rangers
He finally left Birmingham in the summer of 2002, the year they reached the Premier League after 16 years outside the top flight, and signed a contract with Queens Park Rangers in Division Two. This was a return to a previous club as Furlong had been a youth team player at QPR at the start of his career. He continued to do well at Loftus Road, helping them win promotion in 2004, and by the time he left in 2007, he had played 162 league games and scored 54 goals.

Luton Town
On leaving QPR, the 38-year-old Furlong signed for Luton Town who had just been relegated from the Football League Championship. He scored eight goals in 32 games but was unable to prevent the financially troubled side from suffering a second successive relegation.

Southend United
He then signed for League One side Southend United, but made just four appearances during the first half of the season and was loaned out to Barnet in January 2009. After two goals in January the loan spell was extended until the end of the season. His goal in Barnet's 1–0 win against AFC Bournemouth was his 200th senior goal, and he marked the occasion by laying down his shirt and saluting it.

Barnet
He was released by Southend at the end of the 2008–09 season, and joined Barnet on a one-year deal after an excellent pre-season. This was subsequently extended until the end of the 2009–10 season. On 2 June 2010, Furlong was released by Barnet.

Kettering Town
A few weeks later, he joined Conference National club Kettering Town as player-coach. During the 2010–11 season with Kettering, Furlong scored 5 times in 27 appearances for the club – including a brace in a match against Eastbourne Borough on 22 January 2011 – as they finished 15th in the Conference Premier.

St Albans City
On 10 August 2011, Furlong was confirmed as player/coach at St Albans City. He scored on his debut for St Albans in a Southern League Premier Division game against Cirencester Town.

International career
When at Enfield he was capped six times for the England semi-professional team, scoring once. He was also eligible to play for Montserrat.

Coaching career
Having already been on Queens Park Rangers' staff part-time, in September 2012 Furlong was appointed assistant youth development coach within the club's academy to work with the players aged 12 to 16. He went on to manage the under-18 team, and in September 2021 became under-23s manager jointly with Andy Impey.

Personal life
Furlong's son Darnell, who plays as a full back, made his professional debut with Queens Park Rangers in 2015.

References 

Infobox statistics
 Enfield in the Conference, excluding the 1990–91 Isthmian League season: 
 From Coventry City to Kettering Town: 
 St Albans City:

External links
Barnet FC Profile
Luton Town profile
Southend United profile

1968 births
Living people
Footballers from Wood Green
English footballers
England semi-pro international footballers
Association football forwards
Enfield F.C. players
Coventry City F.C. players
Watford F.C. players
Chelsea F.C. players
Birmingham City F.C. players
Queens Park Rangers F.C. players
Sheffield United F.C. players
Luton Town F.C. players
Southend United F.C. players
Barnet F.C. players
Kettering Town F.C. players
St Albans City F.C. players
Isthmian League players
National League (English football) players
English Football League players
Premier League players
Queens Park Rangers F.C. non-playing staff
Black British sportsmen
British people of Montserratian descent